Cboe Global Markets is an American company that owns the Chicago Board Options Exchange and the stock exchange operator BATS Global Markets.

Cboe Global Markets owns and operates four options exchanges: Cboe Options Exchange, Cboe C2 Options Exchange, Cboe BZX Options Exchange, and Cboe EDGX Options Exchange; seven equities exchanges: Cboe BZX Exchange, Cboe BYX Exchange, Cboe EDGX Exchange, Cboe EDGA Exchange, Cboe  Exchange, Cboe  Exchange, and Cboe DXE Exchange; one futures exchange: Cboe Futures Exchange; and one foreign exchange marketplace: Cboe FX.

History
Founded in 1973 by the Chicago Board of Trade and member owned for several decades, on March 11, 2010 the Chicago Board Options Exchange (CBOE) filed paperwork to launch an initial public offering and began trading on the NASDAQ stock exchange on June 15, 2010.

In September 2011, CBOE Stock Exchange (CBSX) entered into an agreement to acquire the National Stock Exchange. The acquisition was completed on December 30, 2011 with both exchanges to operate under separate names. The National Stock Exchange continued to be based in Jersey City. The National Stock Exchange ceased trading operations on May 30, 2014. The closure brought the number of active stock exchanges in the United States to 11, as the CBOE Stock Exchange had closed the month prior. Wrote Bloomberg, that left "just one public exchange, Chicago Stock Exchange Inc., that isn't owned by Bats, Nasdaq OMX Group Inc., or IntercontinentalExchange Group Inc."

In June 2015, CBOE announced its acquisition of the LiveVol platform, a market data services provider.

In January 2016, CBOE announced it had purchased a majority stake in Vest Financial, an investment adviser specializing in "options-centric products".

In September 2016, it was announced that CBOE was purchasing BATS Global Markets, effective in early 2017, for approximately US$3.2 billion.

In October 2017, the company rebranded from CBOE Holdings to Cboe Global Markets in a global rebrand.

In June 2021, Cboe announced that it had completed its acquisition of Chi-X Asia Pacific which had operated an alternative market operator and provided innovative market solutions. Through the acquisition, Cboe established a significant presence in the Asia Pacific region for the first time by gaining access to two of the world's largest securities markets in Japan and Australia.

In May 2022, Cboe completed its acquisition of Eris Digital Holdings (ErisX), a US-based digital asset spot market, regulated futures exchange, and regulated clearinghouse.

See also
 Chicago Board Options Exchange
 Direct Edge
 BATS Global Markets

References

External links

American companies established in 1973
1973 establishments in Illinois
Financial services companies established in 1973
Companies based in Chicago
Companies listed on Cboe BZX
Economy of Chicago
Stock exchanges in the United States
Options exchanges in the United States
2010 initial public offerings